Abbas Abu Amin is a former politician from the People's Action Party (PAP) who has served as the Member of Parliament (MP) for Pasir Panjang Single Member Constituency (SMC) from 23 December 1980 to 17 August 1988 and Pasir Panjang Group Representation Constituency (GRC) from 3 September 1988 to 14 August 1991. 

He studied at Kota Raja Malay School and Victoria School. He went on to the Teachers' Training College and joined the Singapore Armed Forces (SAF) in 1966. He rose to the rank of Major in the Singapore Army.
Abbas was also the Chairman of the Football Association of Singapore from 1988 to 1991, and an active trade unionist in National Trade Union Congress. His son is Ahmad Nizam Abbas, a lawyer.

References

Members of the Parliament of Singapore
People's Action Party politicians
Singaporean people of Malay descent
Living people
Year of birth missing (living people)
Victoria School, Singapore alumni
Singaporean referees and umpires
Singaporean trade unionists